Janardhan Singh Gelhot (died 28 April 2021) was an Indian sports administrator. He was the founder president of the International Kabaddi Federation. He was president of Amateur Kabaddi Federation of India (AKFI) for 28 years. In May 2013, he was made life president of AKFI.

Political career
He was a member of the Indian National Congress before leaving in 2008 and joining the Bharatiya Janata Party. The former BJP party leader rejoined Congress in 2019.

Death
He died in Jaipur on 28 April 2021, after a prolonged illness.

Awards
Big Star Most Entertaining Sportsperson

See also
Pro Kabaddi League

References

Indian sports executives and administrators
Indian kabaddi players
2021 deaths
Place of birth missing
Year of birth missing
Indian National Congress politicians
Bharatiya Janata Party politicians from Rajasthan